Lobin C. Lowe was Malawi's Minister of Agriculture from 8 July 2020  to 25 October 2022. Before that he was elected member of parliament representing Lilongwe Central Constituency in the parliament since 2009. Before being relieved from his ministerial duties, Lowe was also relieved as parliamentary committee chairperson of the heavily politicized and unsustainable Affordable Imput Subsidy Program (AIP).

References

Government ministers of Malawi
Living people
Date of birth missing (living people)
Place of birth missing (living people)
Year of birth missing (living people)